Aknīste is a town in Jēkabpils Municipality in the Selonia region of Latvia, near the Lithuanian border. The town is located near the river Dienvidsusēja. Prior to the 2009 administrative reforms it was part of Jēkabpils District.

History
The town name, Aknīste, was first mentioned in 1298. From the 17th century the settlement was a panhandle of Lithuania and after the partitions of the Polish–Lithuanian Commonwealth part of the Kovno Governorate of the Russian Empire. Since 1918, part of Lithuania, but in the 1921, Lithuania exchanged Aknīste for Palanga.

The settlement was the site of a mass killing of Jewish residents, during the Nazi occupation of the Baltic states. After German occupation forces arrived in Aknīste around the 25th of June, they created defence groups (Schutzmänner) mainly composed of Latvians. The Aknīste group was commanded by Latvian War of Independence veteran J. Valdmanis who had fought against bolshevik forces as a partisan during the war. On the 17th (or the 4th depending on the source) of July, 1941, local Jews were rounded up into hotel "Austrija", with O. Baltmanis, the commander of the Ilūkste region SS einsatzgruppe, an unknown SS oberleutnant, and two SS soldiers present, under the premises that the Jews were to be transported to the Daugavpils ghetto. On the 18th of July, under the orders of O. Baltmanis, and disobeying of said order by J. Valdmanis, the Jews were executed in the yard of the hotel by Baltmanis' Schutzmänner gathered from other parts of Ilūkste.

In 1991, Aknīste was granted the town status.

Gallery

See also
List of cities in Latvia
The Holocaust in Latvia

References

External links

Towns in Latvia
Populated places established in 1991
Novoalexandrovsky Uyezd
1991 establishments in Latvia
Jewish Latvian history
Holocaust locations in Latvia
Jēkabpils Municipality
Selonia